Invader is the fifth studio album by Rapture Ruckus. BEC Recordings released the album on 7 April 2015. The album was produced by Brad Dring and long time collaborator Geoff Duncan.

Critical reception

Signaling in a four star review by Jesus Freak Hideout, Christopher Smith describes, "Fusing these two EPs together and throwing them into a volcano may sound like a hot mess, but the result works surprisingly well." Sarah Fine, indicating in a four and a half star review from New Release Tuesday, replies, "This group runs the gamut melodically, and Invader is a fine example of that."

Track listing

Charts

References

2015 albums
Rapture Ruckus albums